The 1991 IBF World Championships (World Badminton Championships) were held in Copenhagen, Denmark in 1991. Following the results of the women's singles.

Qualification
 Sara Ussher -  Sabine Aberer: 7-11, 11-2, 11-1 
 Helle Andersen -  Nicole Baldewein: 12-10, 12-9
 Bang Soo-hyun -  Yuliani Santoso: 11-5, 11-5
 Felicity Gallup -  Martine de Souza: 12-10, 11-6
 Susanna Kauhanen -  Ana Laura de la Torre Saavedra: 11-2, 11-4
 Astrid Crabo -  Annika Nyström: 11-0, 11-2
 Zhou Qianmin -  Tan Lee Wai: 11-2, 11-5
 Marie-Helene Loranger -  Esther Sanz: 11-8, 11-5

Main stage

Section 1

Section 2

Section 3

Section 4

Section 5

Section 6

Section 7

Section 8

Final stage

References
http://www.tournamentsoftware.com/sport/events.aspx?id=D35444A5-8F1F-4B92-8ACA-39FE076F5602

1991 IBF World Championships
IBF